May Lake is a lake located on Vancouver Island south of San Mateo Bay and Alberni Inlet.

References

Alberni Valley
Lakes of Vancouver Island
Barclay Land District